The Deadly Dinner Party and Other Medical Detective Stories (2009) is a nonfiction book by Jonathan A. Edlow MD about medical mysteries published by Yale University Press. The book relates stories of everyday people caught up in medical crises which take deduction and detective work to solve, and to determine a correct diagnosis. The book has been compared to the "medical mystery" books of Berton Roueché.

See also
Diagnosis
Medical ethics
How Doctors Think
Fatal Care: Survive in the U.S. Health System

External links
Review of book in The New York Review of Books (November 5, 2009)
Review in New Scientist (October 11, 2009)
Yale University Press

2009 non-fiction books
Medical books
Yale University Press books